Mahawatta Grama Niladhari Division is a  Grama Niladhari Division of the  Colombo Divisional Secretariat  of Colombo District  of Western Province, Sri Lanka .

Modara, Madampitiya, Bloemendhal, Sojitz Kelanitissa Power Station, Kelanitissa Power Station and Rock House Army Camp  are located within, nearby or associated with Mahawatta.

Mahawatta is a surrounded by the  Peliyagoda Gangabada, Sedawatta, Wadulla, Bloemendhal, Aluthmawatha, Modara and Madampitiya  Grama Niladhari Divisions.

Demographics

Ethnicity 

The Mahawatta Grama Niladhari Division has  a Sinhalese plurality (45.9%), a significant Moor population (26.1%) and a significant Sri Lankan Tamil population (24.8%) . In comparison, the Colombo Divisional Secretariat (which contains the Mahawatta Grama Niladhari Division) has  a Moor plurality (40.1%), a significant Sri Lankan Tamil population (31.1%) and a significant Sinhalese population (25.0%)

Religion 

The Mahawatta Grama Niladhari Division has  a Buddhist plurality (37.5%), a significant Muslim population (28.0%), a significant Hindu population (16.8%) and a significant Roman Catholic population (13.5%) . In comparison, the Colombo Divisional Secretariat (which contains the Mahawatta Grama Niladhari Division) has  a Muslim plurality (41.8%), a significant Hindu population (22.7%), a significant Buddhist population (19.0%) and a significant Roman Catholic population (13.1%)

Gallery

References 

Grama Niladhari Divisions of Colombo Divisional Secretariat